John Norman Massey (17 November 1885 – 12 December 1964) was a New Zealand politician of the Reform Party and then the National Party.

Biography

Early life and career
Massey was born in Mangere in 1885. He attended Mangere Central School before taking up work on his family farm. In 1907 purchased a farm of his own at Puni, near Pukekohe, where he drained swamp country.

Political career

He became a member, and later chairman, of the Franklin County Council for eighteen years, and Chairman of the Aka Aka Drainage Board for fourteen years. He was a son of Prime Minister William Massey, who held Franklin from 1896 until his death in 1925. He was the brother of Walter William Massey who represented the Hauraki electorate from 1931 to 1935.

He represented the Franklin electorate from 1928 to 1935, when he was defeated by Arthur Sexton of the Country Party. Labour did not run a candidate against him in 1935.

In 1935, he was awarded the King George V Silver Jubilee Medal. After his defeat he was a leading figure in establishing the new National Party and was prominent at the inaugural party conference that established the party structure and rules.

He was re-elected in 1938, as Labour stood a candidate, and the anti-government vote was split between Labour and the Country Party. In 1942 he was one of four National MPs who crossed the floor and voted with the Labour government in a no confidence vote over government handling of a coal miners strike. He was temporarily expelled from the National caucus, but later readmitted. Massey had indicated in both  and  that he would retire at the end of the term only to recant. By 1957, the 72-year old Massey was dumped by the local members in favour of Alf Allen, also a farmer.

Death
He died in 1964.

References

Further reading

1885 births
1964 deaths
Local politicians in New Zealand
New Zealand farmers
Reform Party (New Zealand) MPs
New Zealand National Party MPs
Members of the New Zealand House of Representatives
Unsuccessful candidates in the 1935 New Zealand general election
Unsuccessful candidates in the 1925 New Zealand general election
New Zealand MPs for North Island electorates
Children of prime ministers of New Zealand